Rareș Burnete (born 31 January 2004) is a Romanian professional footballer who plays as a forward for Serie A club Lecce.

Club career 
Rareș Burnete grew up through Colțea Brașov youth academy, before joining the US Lecce in October 2020, along with fellow Romanian footballers Răzvan Pașcalău and Cătălin Vulturar.

Having started training with the Serie B first team on the summer 2021, Burnete made his professional debut for Lecce on 16 December 2021, entering as a substitute in a 0–2 away win over Spezia. He signed a 3 years contract extension the following spring, tying him to the club until 2025.

International career 
Rareș Burnete is a youth international with Romania, having selected with the national under-18.

References

External links

2004 births
Living people
People from Sighișoara
Romanian footballers
Romania youth international footballers
Association football forwards
U.S. Lecce players
Serie B players
Expatriate footballers in Italy
Romanian expatriate sportspeople in Italy